The Stork (formerly known as the Stork Hotel) is a public house and inn in the English village of Conder Green, Thurnham, Lancashire. A former coaching inn, the building dates to 1660. It is now a Grade II listed building.

In January 2020, a fire severely damaged the building. It reopened in August 2021, after twenty months of repairs and renovations.

Gallery

See also
Listed buildings in Thurnham, Lancashire

References

Sources

External links
Stork Hotel – Classic Inns

Pubs in Lancashire
Hotels in Lancashire
Coaching inns
Buildings and structures in the City of Lancaster
Grade II listed pubs in Lancashire
Burned buildings and structures in the United Kingdom
1660 establishments in England